The men's 3000 metres event at the 1966 European Indoor Games was held on 27 March in Dortmund.

Results

References

3000 metres at the European Athletics Indoor Championships
3000